WNCE-CD, virtual channel 8 (UHF digital channel 31), is a low-powered, Class A YTA TV-affiliated television station licensed to Glens Falls, New York, United States. The station is owned by the Northern Broadcasting Company. Formerly an affiliate of Network One and America One, WNCE switched to Youtoo America after America One discontinued operations. Formerly known as TV8, now Look TV (with the "oo" as a sideways number 8), WNCE also airs locally produced programming, including a live music program called 8 Trax Live, and a nightly news program called "North News 8".

See also
Channel 8 virtual TV stations in the United States
Channel 31 digital TV stations in the United States
Channel 31 low-power TV stations in the United States

References

External links 

Glens Falls, New York
NCE-CD
Television channels and stations established in 1986
1986 establishments in New York (state)
Low-power television stations in the United States
YTA TV affiliates